Harald Ellefsen (born 11 December 1950) is a Norwegian jurist and politician for the Conservative Party.

Early life and political career 
He was born in Oslo, took his secondary education in Trondheim, enrolled as a student in 1970 and graduated as cand.jur. in 1976. He spent time from 1971 to 1972 in Drew University. He worked as a part-time journalist in Adresseavisen and Aftenposten between 1971 and 1976, and was a police superintendent in Trondheim from 1977 to 1978. He was then a deputy judge in Onsøy for a year. He returned to Trondheim as chief superintendent from 1980 to 1988, and he also edited the magazine Politiembetsmennenes Blad. He worked as a police inspector from 1988 to 1997 and then lawyer.

Ellefsen was a member of Trondheim city council from 1975 to 1978. He was elected to the Norwegian Parliament from Sør-Trøndelag in 1985, and was re-elected on two occasions. He had previously served in the position of deputy representative during the term 1981–1985, but halfway during this term he moved up as a regular representative following the death of Hermund Eian.

Ellefsen has been a member of the board of the Politiembetsmennenes landsforening (1979–1983), Adresseavisen (1993–2001), the National Insurance Scheme Fund (1998–) and Statskog SF (2005–).

References

1950 births
Living people
Conservative Party (Norway) politicians
Members of the Storting
Politicians from Trondheim
Norwegian police chiefs
20th-century Norwegian politicians
20th-century Norwegian lawyers